Mimmy Martha Gondwe (born 7 February 1977) is a South African politician serving as the Shadow Deputy Minister of Public Service and Administration since December 2020. A member of the Democratic Alliance, Gondwe was Shadow Deputy Minister of State Security from 2019 to 2020. She has been a Member of Parliament (MP) in the National Assembly since May 2019.

Education 
Gondwe holds a Bachelor of Arts (in Political Philosophy) from the University of Cape Town; a Bachelor of Laws from Rhodes University; a Masters of Laws (in Mercantile Law) from the University of Stellenbosch; and a Doctorate of Laws (in Mercantile Law) from the University of Stellenbosch.

Whilst studying towards her PhD at the University of Stellenbosch, Gondwe was awarded a number of scholarships and grants in recognition of her academic achievements. These scholarships and grants included the Fulbright Scholarship, Andrew Mellon Foundation Scholarship, Baden Württemberg Scholarship and the NRF Thuthuka Research Grant.

Gondwe also completed her articles at Webber Wentzel, Cape Town.

Career
Gondwe worked as a Parliamentary Content Advisor and Researcher for the Select Committee on Petitions and Executive Undertakings, before assuming an active role in politics.

Political career 
In March 2019, the Democratic Alliance announced their parliamentary candidate lists for the May general election. Gondwe was number 12 on its national list, a high position for someone who was not a sitting MP. She was easily elected to the National Assembly in the election.

On 5 June 2019, Gondwe was appointed as Shadow Deputy Minister of State Security under Shadow Minister Dianne Kohler-Barnard.  Gondwe also serves on the Joint Constitutional Review Committee. She has also served on the Joint Standing Committee on Intelligence  and the Ad Hoc Committee to Initiate and Introduce Legislation Amending Section 25 of the Constitution.

Gondwe was promoted to Shadow Deputy Minister of Public Service and Administration on 5 December 2020. On 7 December, she became a Member of the Portfolio Committee on Public Service and Administration, Performance Monitoring & Evaluation.

Gondwe is also currently a Member of the Section 194 Enquiry Committee which was established on 7 April 2021 to determine if there are grounds for the removal of Adv Busisiwe Mkhwebane as Public Protector.

References

External links
Dr Mimmy Martha Gondwe at Parliament of South Africa

Living people
1977 births
Democratic Alliance (South Africa) politicians
Members of the National Assembly of South Africa
Women members of the National Assembly of South Africa
21st-century South African politicians